William McGrath (1916–1992) was a loyalist from Northern Ireland.

William McGrath may also refer to:

 William L. McGrath (1894–1975), American business executive
 William Thomas McGrath (1918–1999), executive director of what is now the Canadian Criminal Justice Association
 Bill McGrath (William Desmond McGrath, 1936–2018), Australian politician and Australian rules footballer